The 1985 BMW Championships, also known as the BMW Challenge,  was a women's tennis tournament played on indoor carpet courts at the Marriott Marco Beach Resort in Marco Island, Florida, United States. It was part of the 1984–85 Virginia Slims World Championship Series and was played from January 28 through February 3, 1985. Second-seeded Bonnie Gadusek won the singles title.

Finals

Singles
 Bonnie Gadusek defeated  Pam Casale 6–3, 6–4

Doubles
 Kathy Jordan /  Elizabeth Smylie defeated  Camille Benjamin /  Bonnie Gadusek 6–3, 6–3

References

External links
 ITF tournament edition details

BMW Championships
Avon Cup